We Love You Tecca is the debut mixtape by American rapper Lil Tecca. It was released on August 30, 2019, through Republic Records. The mixtape contains a sole guest appearance from Juice Wrld. It features Tecca's breakout hit, "Ransom", which peaked at number 4 on the Billboard Hot 100 chart, and the remix is with the guest.

The mixtape debuted at number four on the US Billboard 200 chart, earning 68,000 album-equivalent units in its first week. The mixtape was certified platinum by the Recording Industry Association of America (RIAA). The album's sequel, We Love You Tecca 2, was released on August 27, 2021.

Background 
Lil Tecca announced the mixtape and its cover artwork via his Instagram account on August 24, 2019. On August 28, Tecca confirmed the release date of the mixtape to be August 30 on his Instagram story.

Promotion

Music videos 
A music video was released for "Out of Luck" on August 30, 2019. It shows snippets from the music video for his hit single, "Ransom". A video for "Bossanova" was released on January 9, 2020. Music videos for "Count Me Out", "Ransom", "Love Me", and "Did It Again" were released before the album.

Singles 
"Count Me Out" was released as the mixtape's first single independently on September 23, 2018. "Ransom" was released as the second single on May 22, 2019, peaking at number 4 on the Billboard Hot 100. "Molly Girl", & "Love Me" were all re-released as singles on July 15, 2019, with the latter peaking at number 97 on the Billboard Hot 100 chart. "Bossanova" was released as the mixtape's fifth single on July 18, 2019. "Did It Again" was released as the mixtape's sixth single on July 24, 2019, peaking at number 64 on the Billboard Hot 100. The remix of "Ransom", featuring American rapper Juice Wrld, was released as the album's seventh single on August 15, 2019. "Glo Up" was released as the album's eighth single on September 27, 2019.

Critical reception 

The mixtape received mixed reviews. Torsten Ingvaldsen of Hypebeast praised the mixtape, calling it "nothing short of an achievement for the young up-and-comer", and said that Tecca "showcases his talent for crafting a project that holistically pits him at its center."

Daniel Spielberger of HipHopDX, however, stated that the mixtape is a repetitive collection of "mostly muddled tracks that only occasionally show promise." An unnamed writer from Musicjo called the mixtape a "missed opportunity", writing, "instead of rapping about something deep, Tecca restricts himself and operates on a superficial level."

Commercial performance 
We Love You Tecca debuted at number four on the US Billboard 200, earning 68,000 album-equivalent units (including 4,048 in pure album sales) in its first week, surpassing its initial projections of 40,000 units. In its second week, the mixtape dropped to number five on the chart, earning an additional 49,000 units. On September 17, 2020, the album was certified platinum by the Recording Industry Association of America (RIAA) for combined sales and streaming equivalent units of over a million units in the United States.

In the UK, the mixtape sold only 48 pure sales, but saw a debut at number 15 due to heavy streaming consumption.

Track listing 
Credits adapted from Tidal.

Notes
  signifies an uncredited additional producer.

Charts

Weekly charts

Year-end charts

Certifications

References 

2019 mixtape albums
Lil Tecca albums
Albums produced by Pi'erre Bourne